Jefferson Township is one of the eighteen townships of Richland County, Ohio, United States.  It is a part of the Mansfield Metropolitan Statistical Area.  The 2010 census found 4,851 people in the township, 2,952 of whom lived in the unincorporated portions of the township, and 1,899 in the township's portion of Bellville.

Geography
Located in the southern part of the county, it borders the following townships:
Washington Township - north
Monroe Township - northeast corner
Worthington Township - east
Pike Township, Knox County - southeast corner
Berlin Township, Knox County - south
Middlebury Township, Knox County - southwest
Perry Township - west
Troy Township - northwest corner

Part of the village of Bellville is located in northern Jefferson Township. Bangorville, an unincorporated community, is in the southwest corner of the township.

Name and history
It is one of twenty-four Jefferson Townships statewide.

Government
The township is governed by a three-member board of trustees, who are elected in November of odd-numbered years to a four-year term beginning on the following January 1. Two are elected in the year after the presidential election and one is elected in the year before it. There is also an elected township fiscal officer, who serves a four-year term beginning on April 1 of the year after the election, which is held in November of the year before the presidential election. Vacancies in the fiscal officership or on the board of trustees are filled by the remaining trustees.

References

External links
County website

Townships in Richland County, Ohio
Townships in Ohio